Euseius australis is a species of mite in the family Phytoseiidae.

References

australis
Articles created by Qbugbot
Animals described in 1983